The 1999–2000 Slovenian Football Cup was the ninth season of the Slovenian Football Cup, Slovenia's football knockout competition.

Qualified clubs

1998–99 Slovenian PrvaLiga members
Beltinci
Celje
Domžale
Gorica
Koper
Korotan Prevalje
Maribor
Mura
Olimpija
Primorje
Rudar Velenje
Triglav Kranj

Qualified through MNZ Regional Cups
MNZ Ljubljana: Elan, Factor, Ivančna Gorica
MNZ Maribor: Železničar Maribor, Paloma, Pohorje
MNZ Celje: Šentjur, Šmartno
MNZ Koper: Tabor Sežana, Ilirska Bistrica
MNZ Nova Gorica: Idrija, Brda
MNZ Murska Sobota: Veržej, Tromejnik
MNZ Lendava: Odranci, Črenšovci
MNZG-Kranj: Lesce, Britof
MNZ Ptuj: Drava Ptuj, Aluminij

First round

|}

Round of 16

|}

Quarter-finals

|}

Semi-finals

|}

Final

First leg

Second leg

References

Slovenian Football Cup seasons
Cup
Slovenian Cup